The Tánaiste is the deputy head of the government of Ireland and thus holder of its second-most senior office. The Tánaiste is appointed by the President of Ireland on the advice of the Taoiseach. The current office holder is former Taoiseach Micheál Martin, TD, who was appointed on 17 December 2022.

The word was adopted in the 1937 Constitution of Ireland as the title for a member of the government nominated by the Taoiseach to act in their place as needed during periods of the Taoiseach's temporary absence. The longer Irish form, is sometimes used in English instead of "the Tánaiste".

Overview
The office was created in 1937 under the new Constitution of Ireland and replaced the previous office of Vice-President of the Executive Council, which had existed under the Constitution of the Irish Free State, which was first held by Kevin O'Higgins of Cumann na nGaedheal from 1922 to 1927.

The Taoiseach nominates a member of Dáil Éireann, who is also member of the government, to the office. The nominee then receives their seal of office from the President of Ireland in recognition of the appointment. The Tánaiste acts in the place of the Taoiseach during a temporary absence. In the event of the Taoiseach's death or permanent incapacitation, the Tánaiste acts as Taoiseach until another is appointed. The Tánaiste is, a member of the Council of State. The Tánaiste chairs meetings of the government in the absence of the Taoiseach and may take questions on their behalf in the Dáil or Seanad.

Aside from those duties, the title is largely honorific as the Constitution does not confer any additional powers on the office holder. The Department of the Taoiseach is a Department of State, but there is no equivalent for the Tánaiste. In theory, the Tánaiste could be a minister without portfolio, but every Tánaiste has in parallel held a ministerial portfolio as head of a Department of State. Dick Spring in the 1994–1997 "Rainbow Coalition" had an official "Office of the Tánaiste", but other parties have not used that nomenclature. Under Spring, Eithne Fitzgerald was "Minister of State at the Office of the Tánaiste", with responsibility for co-ordinating Labour policy in the coalition.

Under a coalition government, the Tánaiste is typically the leader of the second-largest government party, just as the Taoiseach is usually leader of the largest, but during the coalition governments in 1989–1992, and in 2007–2011 governments, the position was held by a Fianna Fáil member, rather than a member of a junior party. As part of a rotating Taoiseach agreement since 2020, the role of Tánaiste gained increased prominence and responsibility in coordinating and Government policy as it was held by Leo Varadkar for the first half of the Government's term in office prior to his appointment as Taoiseach and Micheál Martin in the second half.

The office of Tánaiste is as yet the highest government rank attained by a woman Minister.

Three Tánaistí later held the office of Taoiseach: Seán Lemass, Bertie Ahern, and Brian Cowen. Two Tánaistí, Leo Varadkar and Micheál Martin, had previously held the office of Taoiseach. Two Tánaistí were later elected as President of Ireland: Seán T. O'Kelly and Erskine H. Childers.

List of office-holders

References

Sources

Citations

 
Lists of political office-holders in the Republic of Ireland
Politics of the Republic of Ireland
Titles of national or ethnic leadership
Lists of deputy prime ministers